The Naco Mammoth Kill Site is an archaeological site in southeast Arizona, 1 mile northwest of Naco in Cochise County. The site was reported to the Arizona State Museum in September 1951 by Marc Navarrete, a local resident, after his father found two Clovis points in Greenbush Draw (eroded by the Greenbush Creek, a tributary of the San Pedro river), while digging out the fossil bones of a mammoth. Emil Haury excavated the Naco mammoth site in April 1952. In only five days, Haury recovered the remains of a Columbian Mammoth in association with 8 Clovis points (including the 2 originally found by the Navarettes). The excavator believed the assemblage to date from about 10,000 Before Present. An additional point was found in the arroyo upstream.  The Naco site was the first Clovis mammoth kill association to be identified.
 An additional, unpublished, second excavation occurred in 1953 which doubled the area of the original work and found bones from a 2nd mammoth. In 2020, small charcoal fragments were found adhered to a mammoth bone from the site. AMS radiocarbon dating produced a mean date of 10,985 ± 56 Before Present.

See also
Lehner Mammoth-Kill Site

References

Further reading
Haury, Emil W., E. B. Sayles, and William W. Wasley, 1986, "The Lehner Mammoth Site Southeastern Arizona". In Emil W. Haury's Prehistory of the American Southwest, edited by J. Jefferson Reid and David E. Doyel, pp. 99–145. University of Arizona Press, Tucson.

Archaeological sites on the National Register of Historic Places in Arizona
Archaeological sites in Arizona
Cenozoic paleontological sites of North America
Clovis sites
Buildings and structures in Cochise County, Arizona
History of Cochise County, Arizona
Paleontology in Arizona
National Register of Historic Places in Cochise County, Arizona